Barrie Truman is a football (soccer) coach who managed the New Zealand national team. Truman first took charge of the New Zealand side in June 1970. New Zealand won 20, drew 13 and lost 16 of his 49 games in charge.

Prior to being appointed as New Zealand coach, he was a member of The FA's staff Coach in 1967, having studied for a Diploma in Physical Education at Loughborough University and an Advanced Diploma at Leicester University. He emigrated from the United Kingdom to New Zealand in 1970. After emigrating he studied for a Masters diploma at Victoria University.

He became Technical Director of the Oceania Football Confederation in 1986 for a short spell which lasted a year.
  
He became manager of the Sport-NZ Council of Recreation/Sport Hillary Commission 1981 and left the position in 1987. He was also President of Coaching NZ between 1981 and 1983.
 
He went on to become a Senior Lecturer in Physical Education at Wellington College of Education in 1987 where he stayed for 17 until years 2004

At the age of 65, he qualified as a "A" level UEFA Professional Coach in 2001.

He was named in the Wellington Hall of Fame in April 2011.

Achievements
New Zealand national team
OFC Nations Cup winner: 1973
Wellington United
New Zealand National Soccer League winner: 1981, 1985 
Miramar Rangers
 Chatham Cup winners: 1992

References

External links

Living people
New Zealand association football coaches
New Zealand national football team managers
1936 births